James Henry Wharton (born 1 February 2001) is an English cricketer. He made his Twenty20 debut on 14 September 2020, for Yorkshire in the 2020 t20 Blast. He made his first-class debut on 14 April 2022, for Yorkshire in the 2022 County Championship.

References

External links
 

2001 births
Living people
English cricketers
Yorkshire cricketers
Place of birth missing (living people)